The Detroit Red Wings are a professional ice hockey team based in Detroit, Michigan. They are members of the Atlantic Division in the Eastern Conference of the National Hockey League (NHL) and are one of the Original Six teams of the league. The Red Wings have participated in all 58 NHL Entry Drafts (where participating teams select newly eligible players in a predefined order) as well as six supplemental drafts and have drafted 540 players.

The NHL Entry Draft is held each June, allowing teams to select players who have turned 18 years old by September 15 in the year the draft is held. The draft order is determined by the previous season's order of finish, with non-playoff teams drafting first, followed by the teams that made the playoffs, with the specific order determined by the number of points earned by each team. The NHL holds a weighted lottery for the 14 non-playoff teams, allowing the winner to move up to the first overall pick. The team with the fewest points has the best chance of winning the lottery, with each successive team given a lower chance of moving up in the draft. Between 1986 and 1994, the NHL also held a Supplemental Draft for players in American colleges. Detroit's first draft pick was Peter Mahovlich, taken second overall in the 1963 NHL Amateur Draft. The Red Wings have chosen first overall three times, selecting Claude Gauthier in 1964, Dale McCourt in 1977, and Joe Murphy in 1986. McCourt and Murphy both spent some time in the NHL with Detroit, but Gauthier never played in the league. Twelve picks went on to play over 1,000 NHL games, while two of these, Nicklas Lidstrom and Steve Yzerman, played in over 1,500 games, both spending their entire NHL careers in Detroit.

Four players drafted by Detroit (Marcel Dionne, Sergei Fedorov, Lidstrom, and Yzerman) have gone on to be inducted into the Hockey Hall of Fame. Yzerman won the Stanley Cup four times with Detroit, three times as a player and once as an executive, and is currently the general manager of the Red Wings.

The 1989 Draft has been noted as having been exceptionally successful for Detroit. While team executive Jim Devellano stated the team would be satisfied with two players from that draft making it to the NHL, seven of them did so. Those seven players (Mike Sillinger, Bob Boughner, Lidstrom, Fedorov, Shawn McCosh, Dallas Drake and Vladimir Konstantinov) amassed 5,995 games played, 1,227 goals, 2,367 assists, 3,594 points and 5,108 penalties in minutes. That draft has also been marked as signalling a paradigm shift for Detroit as prior to that the club was very reluctant to draft players from outside North America. Since then the club has drafted a large number of European as well as other non-North American players. In 2000, for example, they drafted four Swedes, three Russians, two Canadians, one Slovak and one American.

Key
 Played at least one game with the Red Wings
 Spent entire NHL career with the Red Wings

Statistics are complete to the end of the 2021–22 NHL season.

Goaltenders

Detroit has drafted 49 goaltenders, 17 of whom have appeared in the NHL. The first goaltender drafted by Detroit to appear in the league was Jim Rutherford; he played in 457 games with the Red Wings, the Pittsburgh Penguins, the Toronto Maple Leafs, and the Los Angeles Kings. Rutherford has since served as the general manager (GM) of the Hartford Whalers/Carolina Hurricanes and is now the GM of the Penguins. Chris Osgood has the most games played, wins, and ties of any goaltender drafted by the Wings, while Rutherford has the most career losses. Jimmy Howard has the most career overtime losses of any player on the list, while Mrázek has the lowest goals against average.

Skaters

Detroit has drafted 485skaters (defensemen and forwards), 174 of whom have appeared in the NHL. Peter Mahovlich, Detroit's first pick, was also the first pick by the team to play in the NHL. Mahovlich played in 884 games for the Wings, the Montreal Canadiens, and the Penguins. Nicklas Lidstrom and Steve Yzerman are the only two picks to have played in over 1,500 games. Both Lidstrom and Yzerman spent their entire careers in Detroit, had their numbers retired by the team, and were inducted into the Hockey Hall of Fame. Marcel Dionne scored the most goals and points of any player drafted into the league by Detroit, while Yzerman has the most assists. Dionne and Yzerman are the only players drafted by the Wings to have scored at least 600 goals, 1,000 assists, and/or 1700 points. Bob Probert accumulated the most penalty minutes, with 3,300.

See also 
 List of NHL first overall draft choices
 List of undrafted NHL players with 100 games played
 List of NHL players

References 

 
draft picks
Detroit Red Wings